Lawrence Thomas Murphy (born March 8, 1961) is a Canadian former professional ice hockey defenceman. He played over 20 years in the National Hockey League, suiting up for the Los Angeles Kings, Washington Capitals, Minnesota North Stars, Pittsburgh Penguins, Toronto Maple Leafs, and Detroit Red Wings.

He won two back-to-back Stanley Cup championships, the first of two being with Pittsburgh in 1991 and 1992; and then with Detroit in 1997 and 1998.  He was inducted into the Hockey Hall of Fame in his first year of eligibility.

He currently serves as a studio analyst for the Red Wings on Bally Sports Detroit.

Playing career
As a youth, Murphy played in the 1974 Quebec International Pee-Wee Hockey Tournament with the Toronto Shopsy's minor ice hockey team.

After a stellar junior career with the Peterborough Petes and representing Canada at the 1980 World Junior Ice Hockey Championships, Murphy was drafted 4th overall in the 1980 NHL Entry Draft by the Los Angeles Kings. In the 1980–81 NHL season, he set National Hockey League records for most assists and points by a rookie defenceman, with 60 and 76 respectively.  He was eventually traded to the Washington Capitals for defenceman Brian Engblom and winger Ken Houston early in the 1983–84 season, which did not work out in the Kings' favor long-term because of Murphy's prolonged success in the league.

In his 21-season career (1980–2001), Murphy would eventually play for six different NHL teams. In addition to the Kings and Capitals, he also suited up for the Minnesota North Stars, Pittsburgh Penguins, Toronto Maple Leafs, and Detroit Red Wings.

In 1995, after being named an NHL second-team All-Star, in the off-season, Murphy was traded to his hometown Leafs from the Penguins for Dmitri Mironov and a second round pick.  Leafs fans booed Murphy, the highest paid player on the Leafs, mercilessly as a scapegoat for the lack of success the team was having.  He was traded to Detroit for future considerations, and was an integral part of their two consecutive Stanley Cups in 1997 and 1998. In the 1997–98 NHL Playoffs, he tied Paul Coffey's record for most shorthanded goals scored by a defenceman in the playoffs with 2.

When Murphy retired after the 2000–01 NHL season, his 1615 regular season games played stood as a record for the most career games by a defenceman; a mark previously held by Tim Horton. In 2003–04, Scott Stevens of the New Jersey Devils surpassed this mark, finishing the season with 1635 games played.

He was on four Stanley Cup winning teams during the decade of the 1990s, the only NHL player to accomplish this feat. He was a part of the only 2 NHL teams to win back-to-back titles during the decade, the Penguins in 1991 and 1992 and the Red Wings in 1997 and 1998.

In addition to his NHL championships, Murphy also won a Memorial Cup with the Peterborough Petes in 1979. The Petes also reached the championship game the following year, but lost in overtime.

In 1987, Murphy was a key member of Canada's championship team in the Canada Cup.  His six assists tied teammate Ray Bourque for tops in the tournament among defencemen, which included Mario Lemieux's overtime goal in game 2 of the Final against the Soviet Union.  He then scored a goal and two assists in the decisive third game, and was also used as a decoy by Wayne Gretzky on Lemieux's tournament winner.

He was inducted into the Hockey Hall of Fame in 2004. Finishing his career with 1216 points, Murphy is currently the fifth highest scoring defenceman in NHL history, behind Ray Bourque, Paul Coffey, Al MacInnis and Phil Housley.

One of Murphy's most notable successes was the "Murphy Dump".  During his stint with the Pittsburgh Penguins, Murphy would often dump the puck down the ice by lifting it high over the opposing team so that it eventually stopped before the opposing goal line.  This would not only clear the zone safely, but would not result in an icing call.  The "Murphy Dump" was officially coined by Penguins broadcaster Mike Lange.

Broadcasting
Murphy was an alternate color commentator for the Detroit Red Wings on Fox Sports Detroit. He only did color commentator duties for Red Wings west coast road trips in place of Mickey Redmond, from 2003 to 2006 Murphy shared this duty with former teammate Pat Verbeek where they would alternate road trips. However, following the 2005–06 NHL season, Verbeek left the job as broadcaster to become a scout for the Red Wings, and Murphy took over full-time on west coast road trips. In addition in 2006, Murphy started contributing as a studio analyst on pregame, postgame, and intermissions in which he does not broadcast. In the 2007–08 season, Murphy began serving as a "Between-the-Benches" reporter for Fox Sports Detroit when Mickey Redmond was broadcasting, and subbed for Redmond when he had surgery to remove a tumor on his lung. He also made occasional appearances on the NHL Network's nightly hockey highlight show, NHL on the Fly. In March 2013, it was announced by Fox Sports Detroit that he had been fired, after being told they weren't satisfied with ratings. On February 14, 2019, it was announced Murphy will return as a studio analyst for the Red Wings on Fox Sports Detroit for the rest of the 2018–19 season.

Awards and achievements

Member of four Stanley Cup winning teams: 1991 and 1992 (Pittsburgh), 1997, 1998 (Detroit)
Selected to three NHL All-Star Games: 1994, 1996, 1999
Selected to three NHL second All-Star teams: 1987, 1993, 1995
Inducted to the Hockey Hall of Fame in his first year of eligibility (2004)

NHL records

Most Points by a Rookie Defenceman in a Single Season (76) 1980–81
Most Assists by a Rookie Defenceman in a Single Season (60) 1980–81

Career statistics

Regular season and playoffs

International

See also
List of NHL statistical leaders
List of NHL players with 1000 points
List of NHL players with 1000 games played

References

External links

1961 births
Living people
Canadian ice hockey defencemen
Canadian television sportscasters
Detroit Red Wings announcers
Detroit Red Wings players
Hockey Hall of Fame inductees
Los Angeles Kings draft picks
Los Angeles Kings players
Minnesota North Stars players
National Hockey League All-Stars
National Hockey League broadcasters
National Hockey League first-round draft picks
Peterborough Petes (ice hockey) players
Pittsburgh Penguins players
Sportspeople from Scarborough, Toronto
Ice hockey people from Toronto
Stanley Cup champions
Toronto Maple Leafs players
Washington Capitals players